Antonio Fusco (born January 6, 1916) was an Italian professional football player.

He played for 8 seasons (122 games, 4 games) in the Serie A for A.S. Roma.

1916 births
Year of death missing
Italian footballers
Serie A players
A.S. Roma players
Pisa S.C. players
Association football midfielders